Meharia scythica is a moth in the family Cossidae. It is found in Russia (Volgograd and Astrakhan regions).

References

Moths described in 2005
Meharia